Kamtuleh-ye Shahriari (also Romanized as Kamtūleh-ye Shahrīārī; also known as Boneh-ye Kāmtūleh, Kamtooleh, and Kamtūleh) is a village in Howmeh-ye Gharbi Rural District, in the Central District of Ramhormoz County, Khuzestan Province, Iran. At the 2006 census, its population was 120, in 26 families.

References 

Populated places in Ramhormoz County